This is part of a list of students of music, organized by teacher.

K

Dmitry Kabalevsky

Mauricio Kagel

Robert Kahn

Jouni Kaipainen

Friedrich Kalkbrenner

Hedwig Kanner-Rosenthal

M. William Karlins

Richard Karpen

Leokadiya Kashperova

Eli Kassner

Apolinary Kątski

Nikolai Kazanli

Donald Keats

Steven Gates

Milko Kelemen

Reginald Kell

Homer Keller

University of Michigan

University of Oregon

Edgar Stillman Kelley

Johann Peter Kellner

Wilhelm Kempff

Anne Gamble Kennedy

Matthew Kennedy

Johann Caspar Kerll

Patricia Kern

Aaron Jay Kernis

Aram Khachaturian

Abdul Wahid Khan

Allauddin Khan

Ali Akbar Khan

Imdad Khan

Yuri Kholopov

Tikhon Khrennikov

Friedrich Kiel

Earl Kim

Florence Kimball

Yasuji Kiyose

William Kincaid

Johann Erasmus Kindermann

Leon Kirchner

Dumitru Georgescu Kiriac

Johann Kirnberger

Charles Herbert Kitson

Johann Christian Kittel

Johann Friedrich Kittl

Halfdan Kjerulf

Bernhard Klein
Klein (1793–1832), mostly self-taught

Bruno Klein

Jakob Friedrich Kleinknecht

Julius Klengel

Jose Kliass

Karl Klindworth

Friedrich Klose

Hyacinthe Klosé

Franz Kneisel

Iwan Knorr

Friedrich Koch

Zoltán Kodály

Charles Koechlin

Hans-Joachim Koellreutter

Gottfried Michael Koenig

Hans von Koessler

Masayuki Koga

Louis Köhler

Ridley Kohné

Lee Konitz

Aloys and Alfons Kontarsky

Steven en Stijn Kolacny

Mark Kopytman

Nikolai Korndorf

Włodzimierz Kotoński

Serge Koussevitzky

Simon Kovar

Leopold Kozeluch

Antonín Kraft

Leo Kraft

William Kraft

Jonathan Kramer

Martin Krause

Herman Krebbers

Josef Krejčí

Ernst Krenek

Franz Krenn

Hermann Kretzschmar

Leonid Kreutzer

Rodolphe Kreutzer

Jaroslav Křička

Jean-Baptiste Krumpholz

Ivan Kryzhanovsky

Johann Kuhnau

Georg Kulenkampff

Gary Kulesha

Theodor Kullak

Jaap Kunst

Michael Kurek

Karol Kurpiński

Eugene Kurtz

Vilém Kurz

L

Joseph Labor

Helmut Lachenmann

 Juliane Klein

José Luis Torá

Franz Lachner

Vinzenz Lachner

C. K. Ladzekpo

Kobla Ladzekpo

Charles Philippe Lafont

Théophile Laforge

Pierre Lalo

Jacques-Michel Hurel de Lamare

Alexander Lambert

John Lambert

Frederic Lamond

Francesco Lamperti

Giovanni Battista Lamperti

Wanda Landowska

Benjamin Johnson Lang

Jean Langlais

Paul Lansky

Alcides Lanza

John Francis Larchet

Alicia de Larrocha

Eduard Lassen

Orlande de Lassus

Jacob Lateiner

Jarred Dunn (last student)

Gaetano Latilla

Ferdinand Laub

Thomas Laub

Calixa Lavallée

Berthe Laventurier

Albert Lavignac

Mario Lavista

Djane Lavoie-Herz

Henry Lawes

Henri Lazarof

Madé Lebah

Jean-Marie Leclair

Jean-Marie Leclair the younger

Jean-Pantaléon Leclerc

Ton de Leeuw

Nicola LeFanu

Yvonne Lefébure

Gustave Lefèvre

Paul Le Flem

Ethel Leginska

Giovanni Legrenzi

Jacques Leguerney

René Leibowitz

Hugo Leichtentritt

Karl Leimer

Nestor Lejeune

Peter Mandrup Lem

Edwin Lemare

Jacques-Nicolas Lemmens

Henry Lemoine

Charles Lenepveu

Carl Petter Lenning

Leonardo Leo

'

Hubert Léonard

Gustav Leonhardt

Fred Lerdahl

Xavier Leroux

Theodor Leschetizky

Piano assistants:

Franciszek Lessel

Jean-François Le Sueur

Hermann Levi

Ray Lev

Heniot Levy

Lazare Lévy

David Lewin

Henry Ley

Ingvar Lidholm

Estelle Liebling

György Ligeti

Liza Lim 

 Chikako Morishita

Jenny Lind

Magnus Lindberg

Adolf Fredrik Lindblad

Ludvig Mathias Lindeman

Thomas Linley the elder

David Liptak

Bernhard Listemann

Franz Liszt

Henry Litolff

Edward Llewellyn

Miguel Llobet

Charles Harford Lloyd

Normand Lockwood

Johann Bernhard Logier

Antonio Lolli

Vincenzo Lombardi

Marguerite Long

Nikolai Lopatnikoff

Richard Loqueville

Yvonne Loriod

Antonio Lotti

Charles Lucas

Andrea Luchesi

Alvin Lucier

Otto Luening

 

 Dan Cooper

Lennart Lundberg

Giovanni Lorenzo Lulier

Jean-Baptiste Lully

Witold Lutosławski

Elisabeth Lutyens

Luzzasco Luzzaschi

Anatoly Lyadov

Boris Lyatoshinsky

M

Terence MacDonagh

Edward MacDowell

José Maceda

George Alexander Macfarren

Alexander Mackenzie

Giovanni de Macque

Bruno Maderna

Nikita Magaloff

Rudolf Magnus

Gustav Mahler



Artur Malawski

Ivo Malec

Gian Francesco Malipiero

Otto Malling

Mathilde Mallinger

Francesco Mancini

Eusebius Mandyczewski

Leopold Mannes

Eduard Mantius

André Marchal

Louis Marchand

Mathilde Marchesi

 (her daughter)
Dame

Jean-Étienne Marie

Gaetano Marinelli

Antoine François Marmontel

Friedrich Wilhelm Marpurg

Frank Marshall

Martin Pierre Marsick

Maurice Martenot

 (sister)

Frank Martin

Giovanni Battista Martini

Vicente Martín y Soler

Salvatore Martirano

Bohuslav Martinů

Adolf Bernhard Marx

Eduard Marxsen

William Mason

Angelo Mascheroni

Lambert Massart

William Masselos

Jules Massenet

Georges Mathias

Émile Mathieu

Stanislao Mattei

Tobias Matthay

Antoinette Mauté de Fleurville

Nicholas Maw

Richard Maxfield

František Maxián

Charles Mayer

Wilhelm Mayer

Simon Mayr

Carl Mayrberger

Joseph Mayseder

Alberto Mazzucato

John Blackwood McEwen

Colin McPhee

Lambert Joseph Meerts

Étienne Méhul

Gustav Meier

Felix Mendelssohn

Manuel Mendes

Martin-Joseph Mengal

Isolde Menges

Peter Mennin

Tugdual Menon

Gian Carlo Menotti

Yehudi Menuhin

Saverio Mercadante

Aarre Merikanto

Frank Merrick

A. Tillman Merritt

Claudio Merulo

Carlos de Mesquita

Olivier Messiaen

As well as being a prominent composer, the Frenchman Olivier Messiaen was a noted teacher of musical analysis, harmony and composition at the Paris Conservatoire from the 1940s until he retired in 1978. He also taught classes at the Darmstadt new music summer school in 1949 and 1950. This list of students of Olivier Messiaen contains some of the musicians who (like Pierre Boulez, Yvonne Loriod and George Benjamin) attended his classes, or who (like Peter Hill and Jennifer Bate) studied privately with the composer or collaborated with him in preparation for their performances of his music.

 (Paris Conservatoire)

 (Paris Conservatoire, later half of the 1970s)
 (Paris Conservatoire, 1954)
 (Paris Conservatoire, 1960)
 (Paris Conservatoire, 1940s)

 (Paris Conservatoire, 1968–1972)

 (auditeur at the Paris Conservatoire)

 (Paris Conservatoire, '56–'57)
 (Paris Conservatoire, late 1940s)
 (Paris Conservatoire)

 (late 1940s)

 

 (Paris Conservatoire)
 (Paris Conservatoire)
 (Paris Conservatoire, 1970s)
 (Paris Conservatoire, 1940s, she became the composer's second wife)

 (Paris Conservatoire)

 (Paris Conservatoire, 1940s)
 (Paris Conservatoire, 1967–72)
 (Paris Conservatoire)
 (Latin-American Center, Buenos Aires)
 (Paris Conservatoire, 1974–1978)

 (Paris Conservatoire, 1962–64)
 (Paris Conservatoire, 1972–1976)
 (Schola Cantorum de Paris, 1930s)
 (Paris Conservatoire)
 (Paris Conservatoire)

 (Paris Conservatoire, 1952)
 (Paris Conservatoire, 1950s)

 (briefly referred to Messiaen at the Paris Conservatoire in 1951)

Metastasio

Leonard B. Meyer

Friedrich Wilhelm Meyer

Aleksander Michałowski

Wilhelm Middelschulte

Hubert Stanley Middleton

Karol Mikuli

Moritz Mildner

Darius Milhaud

John Milton Ward IV

Rosalie Miller

Anthony Milner

Miloje Milojević

Nathan Milstein

Akira Miyoshi

Emil Młynarski

Robert Moevs

Jérôme-Joseph de Momigny

Stanisław Moniuszko

John La Montaine

Antonio Montanari

Philippe de Monte

Pierre Monteux

Claudio Monteverdi

 ("almost certainly")

Xavier Montsalvatge

Undine Smith Moore

Cristóbal de Morales

Giovanni Morandi

Henri Moreau

Orlando Morgan

Francesco Morlacchi

R. O. Morris

Robert Morris

Composition

Theory

Ignaz Moscheles

Konstantin Mostras

Moritz Moszkowski

Felix Mottl

Henry Moule

Luiz António de Moura

Alexander Moyzes

Franz Xaver Wolfgang Mozart

Leopold Mozart

Wolfgang Amadeus Mozart

Gottlieb Friedrich Müller

Gordon Mumma

Tristan Murail

Thea Musgrave

Nikolai Myaskovsky

References
Citations

Sources

 
 
 Gann, Kyle (1997). American Music in the Twentieth Century. Schirmer. .
 Green, Janet M. & Thrall, Josephine (1908). The American History and Encyclopedia of Music. I. Squire.
 Greene, David Mason (1985). Greene's Biographical Encyclopedia of Composers. Reproducing Piano Roll Fnd.. .
 Griffiths, Paul (2011). Modern Music and After. Oxford University Press. .
 Highfill, Philip H. (1991). A Biographical Dictionary of Actors, Actresses, Musicians, Dancers, Managers, and Other Stage Personnel in London, 1660–1800: S. Siddons to Thrnne, p. 234. SIU Press. .
 Hinkle-Turner, Elizabeth (2006). Women Composers and Music Technology in the United States: Crossing the Line. Ashgate Publishing. .
 Hinson, Maurice (2001). Music for More than One Piano: An Annotated Guide. Indiana University Press. .
 Jones, Barrie; ed. (2014). The Hutchinson Concise Dictionary of Music. Routledge. .
 Mason, Daniel Gregory (1917). The Art of Music: A Comprehensive Library of Information for Music Lovers and Musicians. The National Society of Music. . ( Related books via Google).
 McGraw, Cameron (2001). Piano Duet Repertoire: Music Originally Written for One Piano, Four Hands. Indian University. .
 New Grove. 
 
 
 Sadie, Julie Anne & Samuel, Rhian; eds. (1994). The Norton/Grove Dictionary of Women Composers. W. W. Norton. .
 Saxe Wyndham, Henry & L'Epine, Geoffrey; eds. (1915). Who's who in Music: A Biographical Record of Contemporary Musicians. I. Pitman & Sons.
 Wier, Albert Ernest (1938). The Macmillan encyclopedia of music and musicians. Macmillan.

Students by teacher